= Tulshi =

Village in Maharashtra

Coordinates: 25°21′N 85°26′E

Tulshi is a small village in Ratnagiri district, Maharashtra state in Western India. The 2011 Census of India recorded a total of 966 residents in the village. Tulshi's geographical area is 885 hectares (2,190 acres).
